Davor Sučić (born June 7, 1961), better known by his stage name Sejo Sexon, is a Bosnian rock and roll musician, film score composer, actor and television director. He is most notably the bandleader and a co-founder of the rock group Zabranjeno Pušenje, contributing on all Zabranjeno Pušenje releases. He was one of the founders of the New Primitivism movement in his hometown Sarajevo. As an actor, he has been featured in the Top lista nadrealista.

Music career

1980–1990
Sejo Sexon started playing the guitar at the age of 12. In 1978, he formed a rock band named Pseudo Blues Band with Nenad Janković, a singer and keyboardist who was his neighbor in Sarajevo at the time. The band worked on recording psychedelic compositions in home production and did not have live performances or official releases. In 1980, they invited Zenit Đozić to the band and renamed it to the Pseudo Blues Band Zabranjeno pušenje. Nenad Janković's younger brother, Dražen, was in the band too.

Initially using the pseudonym Elvis J. Spahović, Sejo Sexon was one of the founders of the New Primitivism movement in Sarajevo. In 1981, while most of the band members went off to compulsory military service, Dražen Janković and Sejo Sexon met with Elvis J. Kurtović and they formed the band Elvis J. Kurtović & His Meteors. Additionally, the band expanded by adding Dražen Ričl and Radomir "Hare" Gavrilović. Originally formed as an optional mingle, their first performance was in the fall of 1981. The band soon gets the status of a cult band whose success exceeds notability of their primary bands. Later, Sejo Sexon and Elvis J. Kurtović wrote all songs for their debut album Mitovi i legende o kralju Elvisu, released through RTV Ljubljana in 1984. During this time, Sejo Sexon also worked on the first songs for Zabranjeno Pušenje. Their first recording, "Penzioneri na more idu zimi", was made for Radio Sarajevo in early 1981. In 1982, Sexon left Elvis J. Kurtović & His Meteors.

Sejo Sexon performed with Zabranjeno Pušenje around Sarajevo for two years before beginning to record material for a debut album during Fall 1983 in producer Paša Ferović's modest studio. The shambolic recording process took seven months before the album named Das ist Walter got released by Jugoton in April 1984 in the small print of 3,000 copies, clearly indicative of the label's extremely low commercial expectations. Though the album was initially released in the small print, the final count was 100,000 copies sold, setting a record for exceeding the initial release by 30 times. In Autumn 1984, they embarked on a 60-concert nationwide tour, making them one of the biggest Yugoslav rock attractions after just one album.

In the second part of the 1980s, Sejo Sexon wrote, arranged and produced songs for three more albums of Zabranjeno pušenje. The second studio album Dok čekaš sabah sa šejtanom (English: While you're awaiting dawn with the devil) is released through Jugoton on June 11, 1985. The third Pozdrav iz zemlje Safari and the fourth studio album Male priče o velikoj ljubavi are released through his hometown based record label Diskoton in 1987 and 1989, respectively.

In 1990, Sejo Sexon together with Darko Ostojić (a.k.a. Minka) and Faris Arapović left Zabranjeno pušenje due to different views on political differences in Yugoslav leadership in late 1980s and the band vision as well. In that time, Sejo Sexon and Ostojić worked on their solo record for Diskoton, but that studio album went unreleased due to the start of the Bosnian War.

1995–2010
After the Bosnian War, Sexon moved to Zagreb, Croatia where he lived for some time. Later he came back to Sarajevo, his hometown, and together with Elvis J. Kurtović restored Zabranjeno pušenje. In 1996, members of the sketch comedy show Top lista nadrealista pit orchestra such as Sejo Kovo, Đani Pervan, Dušan Vranić, and Samir Ćeramida had become the core of the renewed band. During that time, the band works on their new studio album. The fifth album of Zabranjeno pušenje Fildžan viška is released through Dallas Records and Nimfa Sound in 1997. Sejo Sexon produced the album and wrote all songs with some help of Kurtović. In November 1995 in Zagreb, he established TLN-Europa, an independent record label and a video production company.

In March 1999, he finished the sixth Zabranjeno pušenje album, entitled Agent tajne sile. The album is released in June of the same year. Next studio album Bog vozi Mercedes, released in December 2001, was record by home made production in improvised studios in Bjelolasica and Ivanić Grad. The album was planned to be a noncommercial break from the major music projects. No one expected that it would become one of the best selling Zabranjeno pušenje albums. The album went on to sell more than 35,000 copies. Sejo Sexon wrote and produced four music videos (out of six) for that album. For the song "Arizona Dream" he won the 2002 Davorin Award for the best rock song.

In 2002, he went with Zabranjeno pušenje on the United States tour. On May 26, they had recorded the band's second live album at the Casa Loma Ballroom in St. Louis, Missouri. For promotional purposed they made a music video for their 1980s hit "Zenica Blues" following the 20th Anniversary of the song's release. The video was shot in the Zenica prison. In 2003, Zabranjeno pušenje was awarded for their outstanding live performance on the Baščaršija Nights festival in Sarajevo.

In 2004, Sexon begun to work on the double-full-length album Hodi da ti čiko nešto da!. In 2005, he wrote a film score for the 2006 Bosnian action comedy film Nafaka. On that project, he got an opportunity to collaborate with prominent musicians of different genres, such as: Halid Bešlić, Arsen Dedić, Lucija Šerbedžija, and the Mosque Choir Arabeske. In June 2006, the song Nema više, the first single from Hodi da ti čiko nešto da! and Nafaka Soundtrack as well, was released and became a hit single. Sejo Sexon wrote this song with a Bosnian prose writer and playwright Nenad Veličković. On November 16, 2006, Zabranjeno pušenje released their eighth studio album. In the same time, he wrote a theme song for the theatre play Grad od snova, produced by the Tuzla National Theatre in Tuzla.

By the end of 2006, Sexon had begun to establish a supergroup Shaderwan Code (a law book of shadirvan), following a sort of a friendly match between the band Zabranjeno pušenje and the Zagreb Mosque Choir Arabeske. The Shaderwan Code's songs harbours folk tradition of the Western Balkans, Bosnian root music, Islamic poetics of the Bosnians and Bosnian Muslims, a concept of rock and roll as primarily progressive music open to various music influences, but also a classic jazz sound. Songs for their first studio album Kad procvatu behari was recorded in 2009.

In Autumn 2008, Sexon worked on the next album for Zabranjeno Pušenje with the band's guitarist Toni Lović. The ninth studio album Muzej revolucije is released on November 7, 2009, on the 92nd anniversary of the October Revolution.

2010–present

In 2011, Sexon directed a music video for the third single of Muzej revolucije, entitled Kada Sena pleše. It was his directorial debut. He also wrote the script for the same music video. On April 15, 2011, Shaderwan Code released their debut album Kad procvatu behari. Sexon also directed a music video for a song "Samir-time", the fifth and last single of Muzej revolucije.

In 2012, Sexon and Toni Lović wrote ten new songs for the tenth Zabranjeno pušenje studio album. On October 10, 2013, Radovi na cesti was released through Croatia Records and Dallas Records. He co-directed two music videos for promotion of this album. On December 28, 2013, Sejo Sexon and Zabranjeno pušenje celebrated 30th Anniversary of the band with their fans on a concert in Skenderija, Sarajevo.

Sexon and Zabranjeno pušenje performed live at the EXIT Summer of Love 2017 in Novi Sad, Serbia, and at the Belgrade Beer Fest in 2017.

Radio and TV career

Top lista Nadrealista
Sexon was working occasionally on the sketch comedy and variety television show Top lista nadrealista in-between 1984 and 1991.  The show was aired on TV Sarajevo. In 1989, he produced theatrical and musical program Top lista nadrealista – Live sown in more than 60 cities in Yugoslavia.

In late June 1992, he started to work on a 15-minute weekly radio shows for Top lista nadrealista. In August 1993, after 50 odd shows on radio, the group shot and aired four television episodes. Sejo Sexon produced a soundtrack for TV series and a theater play Top lista nadrealista. After re-union of Zabrenjeno pušenje in 1996, Sejo Sexon and Elvis J. Kurović had more than 300 occasions where then performed live Top lista nadrealista across Bosnia and Herzegovina, Croatia, Slovenia, Germany, Austria, Denmark and Switzerland. That tour was supported by the USAID office in Sarajevo.

Other projects
In the late 1980s, Sexon wrote film scores for two TV mini series for kids directed by Timothy John Byford and aired on RTV Sarajevo. With Goran Bregović and Miroslav Mandić, he won the Golden Rose award for the best TV advert clip at Monterrey, Mexico in 1990. In 2009, Sexon was a jury member together with Zele Lipovača, Davor Gobac, and Vinko Štefanac on Rat bendova, a musical contest that aired on Bosnian television network OBN.

Humanitarian work
In 1994 and later, Sexon had worked as a project manager for the Umbrella Grant humanitarian organization. They organized more than 80 benefit concerts across in Bosnia and Herzegovina, Croatia, Denmark, Germany, and Slovenia to raise awareness about refugees of Bosnian War. In 2001, Sejo Sexon and his fellow band members from Zabranjeno pušenje took a part in a social responsibility project in which they organized music workshops for children and youth who were victims of land mines. The winter workshops were held in Kranjska Gora, Slovenia, while the summer workshops were held in Rovinj, Croatia. Project was supported by embassies of the Canada, Norway and the U.S. in Zagreb.

Personal life
Sexon was born in Sarajevo, SR Bosnia and Herzegovina, SFR Yugoslavia (present-day Bosnia and Herzegovina) where he finished elementary school and the Second Sarajevo Gymnasium. At the time, he wanted to become a psychiatrist, which entailed first graduating medicine before starting psychiatry specialization studies. He thus enrolled at the University of Sarajevo's Faculty of Medicine, which he put on the back burner after starting to make a living through the band. He never completed his medical studies.

In 2003, Sejo Sexon married Saša Midžor, a Croatian photographer. Together, they have two children: Vito (b. 2004) and Nora (b. 2010). Also, he has a daughter Tesa (b. 1999) from the first marriage and she lives in Sarajevo.

Sexon has been writing short stories and columns for the Croatian daily newspaper Glas Slavonije for more than 15 years. Sejo Sexon earned his bachelor's degree in history from the University of Zagreb in 2009. The dissertation title is "The conflict between youth subcultures and Yugoslav official policy in 1980s".

Discography

Zabranjeno pušenje
Das ist Walter (1984)
Dok čekaš sabah sa šejtanom (1985)
Pozdrav iz zemlje Safari (1987)
Male priče o velikoj ljubavi (1989)
Fildžan viška (1997)
Hapsi sve! (1998)
Agent tajne sile (1999)
Bog vozi Mercedes (2001)
Live in St. Louis (2004)
Hodi da ti čiko nešto da (2006)
Muzej revolucije (2009)
Radovi na cesti (2013)
Šok i nevjerica (2018)
Karamba! (2022)

Shaderwan Code
Kad procvatu behari (2011)
Ah, što ćemo ljubav kriti (2018)

Elvis J. Kurtović & His Meteors
Mitovi i legende o kralju Elvisu (1984)

Film scores
Top lista nadrealista (1984)
Tragom ptice dodo (1988)
Paket (1994)
Nafaka (2002)
Ja sam iz Krajine, zemlje kestena (2013)

Filmography

See also
List of songs recorded by Zabranjeno pušenje
Zabranjeno pušenje videography

References

External links
Biography at zabranjeno-pusenje.com 
 
Sejo Sexon at Discogs

1961 births
Living people
Musicians from Sarajevo
Bosnia and Herzegovina film score composers
Bosnia and Herzegovina guitarists
Bosnia and Herzegovina male guitarists
20th-century Bosnia and Herzegovina male singers
Bosnia and Herzegovina male television actors
Bosnia and Herzegovina rock singers
Bosnia and Herzegovina singer-songwriters
Croats of Bosnia and Herzegovina
Faculty of Humanities and Social Sciences, University of Zagreb alumni
Punk rock singers
Rock songwriters
Zabranjeno pušenje members
Yugoslav musicians
21st-century Bosnia and Herzegovina male singers
New Primitivism people